Gran Hermano 2 launched on March 18, 2001, with the final taking place on June 27, 2001, lasting 102 days. It is the second Spanish edition of the reality franchise Big Brother. Mercedes Milá returned as the main host of the show, also known as the Gala, which consists of both the nominations and the eviction which was broadcast on Telecinco.

Fayna was in La Isla de los FamoS.O.S. 2 in 2003.

In the 2004 season Gran Hermano VIP 1, Marta returned to the house.

Marta was in El Reencuentro in 2011.

Summary 
Start Date: March 18, 2001
End Date: June 27, 2001

Duration: 102 days

The Finalists: 3 - Sabrina (The Winner), Fran (Runner-up) and Mari (3rd)

Evicted Housemates: 9 - Ángel, Alonso, Emilio, Eva, Fayna, Kaiet, Karola, Marta and Roberto

Ejected Housemates: 1 - Carlos

Contestants in eviction order

Nominations Table
This year, Housemates nominated three Housemates for eviction, and the three or more Housemates with the most Nominations faced the public vote.

Notes

Nominations total received

See also
 Main Article about the show

2001 Spanish television seasons
GH 2